The 2005 Ballon d'Or, given to the best football player in Europe as judged by a panel of sports journalists from UEFA member countries, was delivered to the Brazilian midfielder Ronaldinho on 28 November 2005. On 24 October 2005, was announced the shortlist of 50 male players compiled by a group of experts from France Football. There were 52 voters, from Albania, Andorra, Armenia, Austria, Azerbaijan, Belarus, Belgium, Bosnia and Herzegovina, Bulgaria, Croatia, Cyprus, Czech Republic, Denmark, England, Estonia, Faroe Islands, Finland, France, Georgia, Germany, Greece, Hungary, Iceland, Israel, Italy, Kazakhstan, Latvia, Liechtenstein, Lithuania, Luxembourg, Macedonia, Malta, Moldova, the Netherlands, Northern Ireland, Norway, Poland, Portugal, Republic of Ireland, Romania, Russia, San Marino, Scotland, Serbia and Montenegro, Slovakia, Slovenia, Spain, Sweden, Switzerland, Turkey, Ukraine and Wales. Each picked a first (5pts), second (4pts), third (3pts), fourth (2pts) and fifth choice (1pt).

Ronaldinho was the third Brazilian to win the award after Rivaldo (1999) and Ronaldo. Petr Čech (Czech Republic) was the top ranked goalkeeper in the list, at 14th place. Paolo Maldini (Italy) was the best ranked defender, at sixth, while Thierry Henry (France) was the top-ranked forward, at fourth place.

Rankings

Voted players

Non-voted players
The following 26 men were originally in contention for the 2005 Ballon d’Or, but did not receive any votes:

References

External links
 France Football Official website
 Rec.Sport.Soccer Statistics Foundation - "Ballon d'Or" 2005 voting results

2005
2005–06 in European football